USS Murray has been the name of more than one United States Navy ship, and may refer to:

, a patrol boat in commission from 1917 to 1918
, a Wickes-class destroyer in commission from 1918 to 1936
, was a Fletcher-class destroyer in commission from 1943 to 1965

United States Navy ship names